Chadva Rakhal is protected forest reserve owned by erstwhile rulers of Kutch State (Cutch State) near Samatra Village, almost 15-17km from Bhuj, Kutch district, Gujarat, India.

History
Erstwhile rulers of Kutch State (Cutch State 1147-1948) had declared 45 forest reserves, called Rakhiyal, which can not be exploited commercially. After Independence of India in 1947, the reserves became private property owned by former rulers, currently by Pragmulji III. They are now tourist destinations. Chadva Rakhal is the largest reserve having a lake, Pragsar. The lake has crocodiles and several species of fish.

References

Tourist attractions in Kutch district
Forests of India